Stepan Dmitrievich Akimov (1896 – October 29, 1941) was a Soviet general and army commander. 

He was born in what is now Pskov Oblast. He fought in the Imperial Russian Army in World War I before going over to the Bolsheviks. 

During world War II, he commanded the 48th Army (August 4-31, 1941) and the 43rd Army
(October 10–29, 1941).
He died in a plane crash on October 29, 1941 near the village of Golodyaevka, Penza Region. 

He was a recipient of the Order of Lenin, the Order of the Red Banner and the Order of the Red Star. He also received the Jubilee Medal "XX Years of the Workers' and Peasants' Red Army".

Bibliography
 

1896 births
1941 deaths
People from Pskov Oblast
Soviet lieutenant generals
Russian military personnel of World War I
Soviet military personnel of the Russian Civil War
Soviet military personnel of the Winter War
Soviet military personnel killed in World War II
Recipients of the Order of Lenin
Recipients of the Order of the Red Banner